The Hampshire County Courthouse is a Neoclassical edifice in the center of downtown Romney, county seat of Hampshire County, West Virginia. The present building was constructed in 1922 to replace the previous 1833 Neoclassical courthouse that had been destroyed by fire in 1921. The original bell from the 1833 courthouse hangs in the domed bell tower.

Civil War history
During the Civil War, John Baker White was the Clerk of Court for the courthouse.

No court proceedings convened in Hampshire County between 1861 and 1864 and the county's courthouse was used as a stable by Union soldiers stationed in Romney during the war.

Upon learning of this, White was again concerned for the safety of the county's records and proceeded to load land registration records ledger books onto wagons and had them transported to Winchester for safekeeping. White selected for transport only the bound volumes of records which included "deed books, wills, and settlements of estates" and kept the unbound paper records in the courthouse, thus separating them so that the entirety of the county's records could not be destroyed by Union forces. White likely chose to transport the bound volumes of records, as the loose paper records would have been more cumbersome to keep together.

In 1863, when Winchester was no longer a safe location for the storage of Hampshire County's records and they again risked destruction by Union Army forces, White's son Captain Christian Streit White took responsibility for the records and transferred them to Front Royal. When Front Royal became endangered by advancing Union Army forces, Captain White had the records moved to Luray Caverns where they remained for several months. In the Fall of 1864, the county's record books were rescued by Captain White and his company as Union Army troops were in the process of destroying them. Captain White's company loaded about 150 record books into a wagon and they were taken to North Carolina where they remained safely for the duration of the war. Hampshire County's land records survived and were returned to the courthouse following the conclusion of the American Civil War, likely by a soldier returning to the area from North Carolina. Had White not separated the records and sent the bound volumes away for safekeeping, Hampshire County would have lost all its records during the course of the war, as those that remained in the courthouse were destroyed.

Miscellany
The original cast-iron fence that surrounded the 1833 courthouse was removed during reconstruction of the present courthouse and relocated to the Hiett Graveyard on North River between the communities of North River Mills and Pleasant Dale.

Gallery

References

Bibliography

See also 
List of historic sites in Hampshire County, West Virginia
National Register of Historic Places listings in Hampshire County, West Virginia

American Civil War sites in West Virginia
Buildings and structures in Romney, West Virginia
Neoclassical architecture in West Virginia
County courthouses in West Virginia
Courthouses on the National Register of Historic Places in West Virginia
Government buildings completed in 1833
Government buildings completed in 1922
Hampshire County, West Virginia, in the American Civil War
National Register of Historic Places in Hampshire County, West Virginia
Northwestern Turnpike
Tourist attractions in Hampshire County, West Virginia
1833 establishments in Virginia
1922 establishments in West Virginia
Clock towers in West Virginia